Andrew Lewis Prine (February 14, 1936 – October 31, 2022) was an American film, stage, and television actor.

Early life and career

Prine was born in Jennings, Florida. After graduation from Miami Jackson High School in Miami, Prine attended the University of Miami and performed at the acclaimed Jerry Herman Ring Theatre. Prine made his acting debut three years later in an episode of United States Steel Hour. His next role was in the 1959 Broadway production of Thomas Wolfe's Look Homeward, Angel. In 1962, Prine was cast in Academy Award-nominated film The Miracle Worker as Helen Keller's older brother James.

In 1962, Prine landed a lead role with Earl Holliman in the 28-episode series Wide Country, a drama about two brothers who are rodeo performers. After the cancellation of Wide Country, Prine continued to work throughout the 1960s and 1970s, and in such television series as Gunsmoke, Bonanza, The Virginian, Wagon Train, Dr. Kildare, Cannon, Barnaby Jones, Baretta, Combat!, Hawaii Five-O, Twelve O'Clock High, and The Bionic Woman. He played Dr. Richard Kimble's brother Ray in an important first-season episode of The Fugitive.

During the 1960s and 1970s, Prine appeared in supporting roles in a number of films. Prominent among these were three films he made for director Andrew V. McLaglen: The Devil's Brigade (1968), Bandolero! (1968), and Chisum (1970).

During the 1980s and 1990s, Prine continued to work in film and television. Appearances included W.E.B., Dallas, Weird Science, and as Steven in the science-fiction miniseries V and its sequel V: The Final Battle.

Prine worked with director Quentin Tarantino on an Emmy-winning episode of CSI: Crime Scene Investigation and in Saving Grace with Holly Hunter, Boston Legal, and Six Feet Under, in addition to feature films with Johnny Knoxville. The Encore Western Channel has featured him on Conversations with Andrew Prine, interviewing Hollywood actors such as Eli Wallach, Harry Carey, Jr., and Patrick Wayne, and film makers such as Mark Rydell with behind-the-scenes anecdotes.

A life member of the Actors Studio, Prine's stage work includes Long Day's Journey into Night with Charlton Heston and Deborah Kerr, The Caine Mutiny Court-Martial, directed by Henry Fonda, and A Distant Bell on Broadway.

Prine received the Golden Boot Award for his body of work in Westerns (in 2001) and two Dramalogue Critics Awards for Best Actor in a leading role.

Karyn Kupcinet investigation 

Between 1962 and her death on November 28, 1963, Prine dated actress Karyn Kupcinet.

The relationship was problematic; Kupcinet was abusing diet pills along with other prescription drugs.

The problems in Kupcinet's relationship with Prine were mainly due to Prine's objections to making the relationship exclusive. After Kupcinet underwent an illegal abortion in July 1963, the relationship cooled and Prine began dating other women. In turn, Kupcinet began spying on Prine and his new girlfriend.

The Los Angeles County Sheriff's Department later determined Kupcinet had delivered threatening and profane messages, consisting of words and letters she had cut out of magazines, to Prine and herself.

On November 30, 1963, Karyn Kupcinet was found dead in her apartment at the age of 22. Coroner Harold Kade concluded that due to a broken hyoid bone in her throat, Kupcinet had been strangled. Her death officially was ruled a homicide.

During the course of its investigation, the Los Angeles County Sheriff's Department named Andrew Prine as one of its chief suspects. When questioned by law enforcement, Prine said he had talked with Kupcinet twice by phone on Wednesday, the day before her murder, claiming he was trying to resolve a lover's quarrel between them. Detectives considered it possible that, after Prine learned the anonymous threat letters both he and Kupcinet had received had been created by Kupcinet and their unresolved argument, gave him a motive for murder. In addition, both Edward Rubin and Robert Hathaway, the two men who had possibly been the last to see her alive, were friends of Prine. They eventually were named as suspects.

In 1988, Kupcinet's father Irv Kupcinet published a memoir in which he revealed that he and his wife Essee believed that Andrew Prine had nothing to do with their daughter's murder. He was suspicious of a person, still alive when he wrote his memoir, who had no connection to Prine. Irv Kupcinet named David Lange, a neighbor of his daughter, who had twice confessed to friends he was guilty. Later when questioned, Lange suggested he was kidding. However, a girlfriend with Lange in his upper apartment told him about the police activity at his friend Karen's apartment and his reaction was adamant and told her to close the drapes and keep quiet. She thought his demeanor was strange as Lange often had been in Karyn's apartment.

David Lange was still alive when Iv Kupcinet wrote his memoir and named David Lange. Lange did not sue for libel.
Irv Kupicinet also wrote Prine had no connection to Karyn Kupcinet's death.

Death 
Prine died of natural causes while on vacation in Paris on October 31, 2022 at the age of 86.

Filmography

 Kiss Her Goodbye (1959) as Kenneth 'Kenny' Grimes
 The Miracle Worker (1962) as James Keller
 Advance to the Rear (1964) as Pvt. Owen Selous
 Texas Across the River (1966) as Lt. Sibley
 The Devil's Brigade (1968) as Pvt. Theodore Ransom
 Bandolero! (1968) as Deputy Sheriff Roscoe Bookbinder
 This Savage Land (1969, TV movie) as Timothy Pride
 Generation a.k.a. A Time for Caring, A Time for Giving (1969) as Winn Garand
 Along Came a Spider (1970, TV movie) as Sam Howard
 Chisum (1970) as Alex McSween
 Lost Flight (1970, TV movie) as Jonesy
 Night Slaves (1970, TV movie) as Fess Beany / Noel
 Simon, King of the Witches (1971) as Simon Sinestrari
 Squares a.k.a. Honky Tonk Cowboy, Riding Tall (1972) as Austin Ruth
 Another Part of the Forest (1972, TV movie) as Oscar Hubbard
 Crypt of the Living Dead a.k.a. La tumba de la isla maldita, Vampire Women (1973) as Chris Bolton
 One Little Indian (1973) as Chaplain
 Wonder Woman (1974, TV movie) as George Calvin
 Nightmare Circus (1974) as Andre
 Centerfold Girls (1974) as Clement Dunne
 Rooster Cogburn (1975) as Fiona's Husband (uncredited)
 The Deputies a.k.a. The Law of the Land (1976, TV movie) as Travis Carrington
 Grizzly (1976) as Don Stober
 The Winds of Autumn (1976) as Wire Hankins
 The Town That Dreaded Sundown (1976) as Deputy Norman Ramsey
 The Evil (1978) as Prof. Raymond Guy
 Abe Lincoln: Freedom Fighter (1978) as Luke
 Amityville II: The Possession (1982) as Father Tom
 They're Playing with Fire (1984) as Michael Stevens
 Eliminators (1986) as Harry Fontana
 Chill Factor (1989) as Kioshe Jones
 Life on the Edge (1992) as Dr. Roger Hardy
 Deadly Exposure (1993) as Richard Anthony
 Gettysburg (1993) as Brig. Gen. Richard B. Garnett
 Wolfridge (1994) as Jack Haig
 Without Evidence (1995) as John Nelson
 Serial Killer (1995) as Perry Jones
 The Dark Dancer (1995) as Dr. Paul Orenstein
 The Shadow Men (1998) as MIB #1
 Possums (1998) as Mayor Charlie Lawton
 The Boy with the X-Ray Eyes a.k.a. X-Ray Boy, X-treme Teens (1999) as Malcolm Baker
 Witchouse 2: Blood Coven (2000) as Sheriff Jake Harmon / Angus Westmore
 Critical Mass (2001) as Sen. Cook
 Sweet Home Alabama (2002) as Sheriff Holt (uncredited)
 Gods and Generals (2003) as Brig. Gen. Richard B. Garnett (uncredited)
 Glass Trap (2005) as Sheriff Ed
 The Dukes of Hazzard (2005) as Angry Man
 Hell to Pay (2005) as Matt Elden
 Daltry Calhoun (2005) as Sheriff Cabot
 Sutures (2009) as Dr. Hopkins
 Treasure of the Black Jaguar (2010) as Andrew Prine
 Lords of Salem (2012) as Reverend Jonathan Hawthorne
 Beyond the Farthest Star (2015) as Senator John Cutter

Television

 U.S. Steel Hour (1 episode, 1957)
 Playhouse 90 (1 episode, 1960)
 Tombstone Territory (1 episode, "Revenge", 1960)
 Alcoa Presents: One Step Beyond (1 episode, 1960)
 Overland Trail (1 episode, "Sour Annie", 1960)
 Peter Gunn (1 episode, 1960)
 The DuPont Show of the Month (1 episode, 1961)
 Have Gun — Will Travel (2 episodes, 1960–1961)
 Alfred Hitchcock Presents (1 episode, 1962)
 The Defenders (1 episode, 1962)
 Alcoa Premiere (2 episodes, 1961–1962)
 The New Breed (1 episode, 1962)
 Ben Casey (1 episode, 1962)
 The Wide Country (28 episodes, 1962–1963)
 Vacation Playhouse (1 episode, 1963)
 Gunsmoke (3 episodes); as Billy Joe in S7E33's "The Prisoner" (1962); as Clay Tatum on S8E5's "False Front" (1962) & as Elmo Sippy in S9E5's "Easy Come" (1963)
 The Lieutenant (1 episode, 1963)
 The Great Adventure (1 episode, 1963)
 Advance to the Rear (1964)
 Profiles in Courage (1 episode, 1964)
 Wagon Train a.k.a. Major Adams, Trail Master (2 episodes, 1964–1965)
 Combat! (1 episode, "Billy the Kid", 1965)
 Kraft Suspense Theatre (1 episode, 1965)
 Bonanza (1 episode, "Jonah", 1965)
 Dr. Kildare (7 episodes, 1963–1965)
 Convoy (1 episode, 1965)
 Twelve O'Clock High (2 episodes, 1964–1965)
 The Fugitive (2 episodes, 1964–1965)
 The Road West (Unknown episodes, 1966)
 Tarzan (1 episode, 1966)
 The Invaders (1 episode, 1967)
 Daniel Boone (1 episode, 1968)
 Felony Squad (1 episode, 1968)
 Ironside (2 episodes, 1968)
 The Virginian (5 episodes, 1965–1969)
 Love, American Style (1 episode, 1969)
 Insight (1 episode, 1970)
 Lancer (2 episodes, 1968–1970)
 The Name of the Game (2 episodes, 1968–1970)
 Matt Lincoln (1 episode, 1970)
 The Most Deadly Game (1 episode, 1970)
 Dan August (1 episode, 1970)
 The Courtship of Eddie's Father (1 episode, 1971)
 Dr. Simon Locke a.k.a. Police Surgeon (1 episode, 1971)
 The F.B.I. (3 episodes, 1968–1973)
 The Delphi Bureau (1 episode, 1973)
 Kung Fu (1 episode, 1974)
 Banacek (1 episode, 1974)
 Hawkins (1 episode, 1974)
 Barnaby Jones (2 episodes, 1973–1974)
 Cannon (2 episodes, 1971–1974)
 Amy Prentiss (1 episode, 1974)
 Kolchak: The Night Stalker (1 episode, "Demon in Lace", 1975)
 Barbary Coast (1 episode, 1975)
 Hawaii Five-O (1 episode, 1975)
 The Family Holvak (2 episodes, 1975)
 Riding With Death (1 episode, 1976)
 Baretta (2 episodes, 1975–1976)
 Quincy, M.E. (1 episode, 1977)
 Tail Gunner Joe (1977)
 Hunter (1 episode, 1977)
 The Bionic Woman (1 episode, 1977)
 The Last of the Mohicans (1977)
 Christmas Miracle in Caufield, U.S.A. a.k.a. The Christmas Coal Mine Miracle (1977)
 Abe Lincoln: Freedom Fighter (1978)
 W.E.B. (5 episodes, 1978)
 Donner Pass: The Road to Survival (1978)
 Flying High (1 episode, 1979)
 Mind Over Murder (1979)
 The Littlest Hobo (2 episodes, 1979)
 M Station: Hawaii (1980)
 One Day at a Time (1980)
 Callie & Son a.k.a. Callie and Son a.k.a. Rags to Riches (1981)
 A Small Killing (1981)
 Darkroom (1 episode, Undated)
 Hart to Hart (1 episode, 1982)
 The Fall Guy (1 episode, 1983)
 V a.k.a. V: The Original Miniseries (1983)
 Boone as A.W. Holly in "The Graduation" (1983)
 Trapper John, M.D. (1 episode, 1984)
 No Earthly Reason (1984)
 They're Playing with Fire (1984)
 V: The Final Battle (1984)
 Matt Houston (2 episodes, 1984)
 Cover Up (1 episode, 1984)
 And the Children Shall Lead a.k.a. Wonderworks: And the Children Shall Lead (1985)
 Danger Bay (2 episodes, 1986)
 Paradise a.k.a. Guns of Paradise (1 episode, 1988)
 Dallas (1 episode, 1989)
 Freddy's Nightmares a.k.a. Freddy's Nightmares - A Nightmare on Elm Street: The Series (2 episodes, 1989)
 In the Heat of the Night (1 episode, 1990)
 Murder, She Wrote (4 episodes, 1984–1991)
 Parker Lewis Can't Lose (1 episode, 1991)
 Mission of the Shark: The Saga of the U.S.S. Indianapolis (1991)
 Matlock (1 episode, 1991)
 FBI: The Untold Stories (1 episode, 1992)
 Room for Two (26 episodes, 1992)
 Dr. Quinn, Medicine Woman (1 episode, 1993)
 Star Trek: The Next Generation (1 episode, 1993)
 Scattered Dreams a.k.a. Scattered Dreams: The Kathryn Messenger Story (1993)
 Married... with Children (1 episode, 1994)
 Weird Science (Unknown number of episodes, 1994–1996)
 Night Stand with Dick Dietrick (1 episode, 1995)
 The Avenging Angel (1995)
 Star Trek: Deep Space Nine (1 episode, 1995)
 University Hospital (1 episode, 1995)
 Pointman (1 episode, 1995)
 Baywatch Nights (1 episode, 1996)
 Melrose Place (1 episode, 1996)
 Walker, Texas Ranger a.k.a. Walker (1 episode, 1997)
 Silk Stalkings (1 episode, 1997)
 JAG (1 episode, 1999)
 The Miracle Worker (2000)
 James Dean (2001)
 Six Feet Under (2 episodes, 2004)
 CSI: Crime Scene Investigation (2005)
 Boston Legal (1 episode, 2006)
 Hollis & Rae (2006)
 Saving Grace (1 episode, 2008)

References

External links
 

1936 births
2022 deaths
Male actors from Miami
People from Hamilton County, Florida
American male film actors
American male stage actors
American male television actors
Male actors from Los Angeles
20th-century American male actors
21st-century American male actors